Laino Castello is a town and comune in the province of Cosenza, in the Calabria region of southern Italy.

See also
Laino Borgo

References

Cities and towns in Calabria